Basketball was one of the 26 sports disciplines held in the 1986 Asian Games in Seoul, South Korea. China swept all their assignments in the round robin format en route to their 2nd title both in the men's and women's tournament. The games were held from September 20 to October 3, 1986.

Medalists

Medal table

Final standing

Men

Women

References 
 Men's Results
 Women's Results

 
Basketball
1986
1986 in Asian basketball
International basketball competitions hosted by South Korea